"Sanctuary" is a song by Trance producer Gareth Emery featuring vocals by Lucy Saunders. It was released on 8 August 2010 by Emery's own record label Garuda.  It was voted the 2nd biggest track of 2010 by listeners of Armin van Buuren's A State Of Trance radio show and became the most played record of 2011 on US Sirius XM Radio dance station BPM. Later in 2021, "Sanctuary" was ranked #47 in A State of Trance's Top 1000.

Sanctuary (The Remixes) 
On 19 September 2011, a remix extended play of Sanctuary was released, featuring 4 remixes from various artists, including remixes from electronic producers Ben Gold, Paul Thomas & Myke Smith, Miss Nine and Ephixa. Senthil Chidambaram of Dancing Astronaut generally liked the Paul Thomas & Myke Smith Remix, stating "The progressive melody meshed with Lucy Saunders voice creates a spiritual calming feel throughout the entirety of the track". DJMag.com gave the remix EP a 7.5/10, stating:Sanctuary seemed to be all about its super-contagious chorus. Ben Gold's remix challenges that by strongly emphasising and amping up its angular lead-line. Ephixa goes for a twitchy, spasmodic bit of dubstep-ery, which is ok, of the type. Miss Nine's charts some straight-up fluffy trance waters with hers, while Paul Thomas & Myke Smith opt for a darker, cooler locale.

Track listing

Sanctuary – EP

Sanctuary (The Remixes)

Release history

References

2010 songs
Electronic songs
Trance songs
2010 singles